DiCarlo or diCarlo is an Italian surname. Notable people with the surname include:

Surname
David C. DiCarlo (born 1945), American politician
David F. Girard-diCarlo (born 1943), American diplomat
Dominick L. DiCarlo (1928–1999), American lawyer and politician
Gabi DiCarlo (born 1985), American stock car racing driver
George DiCarlo (born 1963), American swimmer
James DiCarlo, American neuroscientist
Joseph DiCarlo (1936–2020), American politician
Robert DiCarlo, American politician
Rosemary DiCarlo (born 1947), American diplomat

Middlename
Veronica DiCarlo Wicker (1930 – 1994), American jurist

See also

Carlo (name)
DeCarlo
Di Carlo

Notes

Italian-language surnames
Surnames from given names